Boulaye is a name that may refer to the following notable people:
Boulaye Dia (born 1996), French football player
André Lefebvre de La Boulaye (1876–1966), French Ambassador in Washington
Agathe de La Boulaye, French film and television actress
Patti Boulaye (born 1954), British-Nigerian singer, actress and artist